The La Posta Band of Diegueño Mission Indians of the La Posta Reservation is a federally recognized tribe of the Kumeyaay Indians, who are sometimes known as Mission Indians.

Reservation
The La Posta Reservation is a federal Indian reservation located within the southern Laguna Mountains west of Boulevard, in eastern San Diego County, California. The reservation is  large with a population of approximately 18. The reservation borders the Cleveland National Forest and is accessed only by one unpaved road that is usually fenced off to prevent trespassers.

It was established in 1893. In 1973, none of the 4 enrolled members lived on the reservation.

History

Mission Indians are indigenous people of California who were forcibly removed from their lands and placed in Franciscan Missions during the mid-16th century because of Spanish settlers.  There are approximately 21 Franciscan Mission within California starting from San Jose and ending in San Diego.  Many of the Missions we see today were built by native tribes who forced to create these monuments by corporal punishment

Most of the Indians who lived within these Missions across California, were regional natives who had resided within these lands for centuries. The La Posta Band of Diegueño Mission Indians are a sub group of the Kumeyaay band of Indians. Evidence shows that these tribes have been present within California for more than 12,000 years. The La Posta Mission Indians share the same ancestral roots as the Kumeyaay people which began with the association the California Coast and Valley tradition and the Desert tradition.

Language
La Posta Band Mission Indians speak three languages English, Kumeyaay, and Tiipai 
The natives can speak three languages based on the geographical area in which they live. Tiipai is mainly seen in tribes of northern Baja California and Southern San Diego, which is known as Southern Diegueño.  Since the reservation of this tribe expands 4,000 acres, some of its territory extends towards Yuma Arizona where their closest relatives reside. Tiipai belongs to the Yuman branch of the greater Hokan linguistic family. This is one of the reasons why they have adopted the Southern Diegueño language. With regards to Kumeyaay, this tribe is able to speak this language based on its ancestral origins that derived from the Kumeyaay tribe, which they share similar languages, cultural and spiritual practices.

Government
The La Posta Band is headquartered in Boulevard. They are governed by a democratically elected tribal council. Gwendolyn Parada is their current tribal chairperson. The La Posta Reservation is governed by a general council. Elected council members include a chairperson, a vice-chairperson, and a business manager. Elected members serve two-year terms, and the general council meets twice a year. The band is organized under an IRA constitution that was approved on March 5, 1973.

Economic development
The tribe owned and operated the La Posta Casino and Marie's Restaurant in Boulevard which closed in 2012.

Education
The tribes education comes from the Mountain Empire Unified School District that was founded in 1923. The economic development of the district has increased over that last few years allowing it to now consist of two elementary schools, Pre-K through 8th grade; two elementary schools, Pre-K through 5th grade; two middle schools, 6th through 8th grade; one high school; an Alternative Education Program and a Transition Program which serves Special Education students after high school, ages 18 to 22.

References

Notes

Sources
 Eargle, Jr., Dolan H. Northern California Guide: Weaving the Past and Present. San Francisco: Tree Company Press, 2000. .
 Pritzker, Barry M. A Native American Encyclopedia: History, Culture, and Peoples. Oxford: Oxford University Press, 2000. .
 Shipek, Florence C. "History of Southern California Mission Indians." Handbook of North American Indians. Volume ed. Heizer, Robert F. Washington, DC: Smithsonian Institution, 1978. 610-618. .

External links
 Official La Posta Band of Mission Indians Tribal information website
official La Posta Casino website

Kumeyaay
California Mission Indians
Federally recognized tribes in the United States
Laguna Mountains
Native American tribes in San Diego County, California
Native American tribes in California
Mountain Empire (San Diego County)
1893 establishments in California